VC1  may refer to:

 VC-1, a video coding format
 VC-1A, the Brazilian Air Force One, the call sign of the aircraft carrying the President of Brazil
 Vickers VC.1 Viking, a British aircraft
 Videocipher 1, an analogue broadcast encoder
 First Vatican Council, a Catholic Church council convened in 1868
 Valkyria Chronicles (video game), a 2008 tactical role-playing video game
 Virtua Cop, a 1994 lightgun shooter video game

See also 
 VCI (disambiguation)